The 1917 Canadian federal election (sometimes referred to as the khaki election) was held on December 17, 1917, to elect members of the House of Commons of Canada of the 13th Parliament of Canada.  Described by historian Michael Bliss as the "most bitter election in Canadian history", it was fought mainly over the issue of conscription (see  Conscription Crisis of 1917). The election resulted in Prime Minister Sir Robert Borden's Unionist government elected with a strong majority and the largest percentage of the popular vote for any party in Canadian history.

The previous election had been held in 1911 and was won by Borden's Conservatives. Normally, there is a constitutional requirement that Parliament last no longer than five years, which would have resulted in an election in 1916.  However, citing  the emergency of the Great War, the Parliament of Canada approved a one-year extension, which was implemented by the British Parliament.  The Borden government hoped that the delay would allow the formation of a "grand coalition" government, encompassing all the parties, such as existed in Britain.

Sir Wilfrid Laurier, head of the Liberal Party of Canada, refused to join the coalition over the issue of conscription, which was strongly opposed in the Liberal heartland of Quebec. Laurier worried that agreeing to Borden's coalition offer would cause that province to abandon the Liberals and perhaps even Canada. Borden proceeded to form a "Unionist" government, and the Liberal Party split over the issue. Many English Canadian Liberal MPs and provincial Liberal parties in English Canada supported the new Unionist government.

To ensure victory for conscription, Borden introduced two laws to skew the voting towards the government. The first, the Wartime Elections Act, disenfranchised conscientious objectors and Canadian citizens if they were born in enemy countries and had arrived after 1902. The law also gave female relatives of servicemen the vote.  Thus, the 1917 election was the first federal election in which some women were allowed to vote. The other new law was the Military Voters Act, which allowed soldiers serving abroad to choose which riding their vote would be counted in or to allow the party for which they voted to select the riding in which the vote would be counted. That allowed government officials to guide the strongly pro-conscription soldiers into voting in those ridings where they would be more useful. Servicemen were given a ballot with the simple choice of "Government" or "Opposition". It is calculated that the Unionist government took 14 seats from the Opposition due to its use of Army votes.

Soon after these measures were passed, Borden convinced a faction of Liberals (using the name Liberal-Unionists) along with Gideon Decker Robertson, who was described as a "Labour" Senator (but was unaffiliated with any Labour Party) to join with them, forming the Unionist government in October 1917. He then dissolved parliament to seek a mandate in the election, which pitted "Government" candidates, running as the Unionist Party, against the anti-conscription faction of the Liberal Party, which ran under the name Laurier Liberals. As well, Independent, Labour and Socialist candidates ran in many ridings across the country.

The divisive debate ended with the country divided on linguistic lines. The Liberals won 82 seats, 62 in Quebec, with many other seats won in provinces such as Manitoba, New Brunswick, and Ontario in ridings with significant French Canadian populations. The Unionists won 153 seats. The three Unionist won seats in Quebec were all in mainly English-speaking ridings. That led to the Francœur Motion in January 1918.

Out of 235 seats, 33 were won by acclamation—17 to the Laurier Liberals (all in Quebec) and 16 to the Unionists (all outside Quebec).  Two of the Unionist acclamations were for the riding of Halifax, where the only candidates were two Unionists, and where, eleven days earlier, the tragic Halifax Explosion had taken place.

The election was conducted mostly using First past the post in single-member ridings but Ottawa and Halifax each had two members and each of the voters there cast up to two votes as per Plurality block voting.

National results 

Notes:

* Party did not nominate candidates in the previous election.

1 % change for Government compared to Conservative Party (including Liberal-Conservatives) in 1911 election, and for Opposition to Liberal Party.

Results by province

See also
 
List of Canadian federal general elections
List of political parties in Canada
11th Canadian Parliament
13th Canadian Parliament
Conscription crisis of 1917
Khaki election

Notes

References

Primary sources

Further reading
 
 
 

 Federal
1917
December 1917 events